HAP1 cells are a cell line of human origin used for biomedical and genetic research. They are near haploid, having one copy of almost every chromosome and are smaller than the average human cell, growing to about 11 micrometers in diameter. HAP1 cells are derived from a line of cancerous cells, which means they are able to divide indefinitely.

Origin 
HAP1 cells are a near-haploid cell line derived from the KBM-7 cell line. KBM-7 was found in a patient with chronic myeloid leukemia (CML). This cell line has a haploid karyotype except for chromosomes 8 and 15. It also possesses a reciprocal chromosomal translocation of Chromosomes 9 and 22 which created a Philadelphia chromosome. Due to the nature of the translocation, no genetic material was lost. Philadelphia chromosomes are common in myeloid leukemia cells. After its discovery, subsequent experiments have resulted in the HAP1 cell line. HAP1 has lost the extra copy of chromosome 8 and has a fragment of chromosome 15 that is about 30-megabases long and encompasses about 330 genes. It is attached to the long arm of Chromosome 19. Chromosomal abnormalities are common in cancer cells. Due to the haploid karyotype, the tumor suppressor genes have been lost, but it is unknown by which mechanism the reduction of chromosomes occurs. They can have less than 40 chromosomes and continue to function as neoplastic cells, however; encountering leukemic cells with less than 30 chromosomes, a near haploid number, is very rare.

Structure 
HAP1 cells are malignant neoplastic cells, also known as cancer cells. These cells are characterized primarily by uninhibited growth. As the rate of mitosis increases, defects in the nuclear spindles form, which results in atypical chromosomes, such as those found in HAP1 cells. Due to their irregular chromosomes, malignant cells are also morphologically different from healthy cells. These cells are often irregular shapes and sizes. They have large nuclei, prominent nucleoli, and scarce or atypically colored cytoplasm. Ribosomes and mRNA accumulate in the cytoplasm and membrane bound organelles change in shape, size, and function. Some become larger than normal, greatly reduced, or entirely non-existent. HAP1 cells are derived from leukemic cells, which develop from mutated myeloid cells in the bone marrow. Healthy myeloid cells produce red blood cells, platelets and white blood cells (apart from lymphocytes). For CML to develop, an abnormal gene called BCR-ABL is formed, which turns the myeloid cell into a CML cell.

Biomedical Research 
Due to their haploidy, HAP1 cells are very useful in biomedical research and genetic experiments. When working in diploid cells, it is difficult to screen for mutations phenotypically, especially when considering recessive mutations. Because there are two copies of each gene, the mutation is often covered up by the non-mutated gene. In haploid cells, there is only one copy of each gene, so mutated phenotypes are immediately exposed. Before the development of haploid cells, much of this research was limited to microbes and other simple cells, but now the research can be applied to its target cell type: the human cell. Since their recent discovery, HAP1 cells cultured in vitro have been established as a dependable screening tool for targeted genetics screens.

Further Research 
HAP1 cells have been used to create a new completely haploid cell line. Researchers used CRISPR/Cas9 system to delete the portion of Chromosome 15 that is present in HAP1 cells. They simultaneously cleaved both ends of the Chromosome 15 region by the endonuclease Cas9, which led to the elimination of the fragment. The Cas9 was programmed by short guide RNAs (gRNAs) to cleave any sequence complementary them. The sequence for the Chromosome 19/15 fusion is unknown, so the gRNAs were programmed to cut within the Chromosome 15 region. With this technique, experimenters were able to cultivate the first fully haploid human cell line which they termed eHAP.

References

External links
Cellosaurus entry for HAP1

Human cell lines